Tom Bliss (born 12 March 1993) is a retired American professional rugby union player. Born in New York but raised in England having moved when aged 5 months, he played as a scrum half for the San Diego Breakers in PRO Rugby, Wasps in the English Premiership and the United States internationally. In 2017 Bliss retired from playing professional rugby due to the effects of repeated concussions. 

He is now a Personal Trainer trading as TOMBLISSFIT. .

References

Living people
1993 births
American rugby union players
Wasps RFC players
Rugby union wings
United States international rugby union players
People educated at Epsom College
Alumni of Loughborough University
San Diego Breakers players
Ealing Trailfinders Rugby Club players